Canadian Forces Station Kamloops (ADC ID: SM-153/C-153) is a closed General Surveillance Radar station. It was closed in 1988.

It was operated as part of the Pinetree Line network controlled by NORAD.

History
As a result of the Cold War and with the expansion of a North American continental air defence system, The site at Kamloops was selected as a site for a United States Air Force (USAF) radar station, one of the many that would make up the Pinetree Line of Ground-Control Intercept (GCI) radar sites. Construction on the base began in 1956 and was completed in 1957. The base was manned by members of the USAF's Air Defense Command (ADC) 825th Aircraft Control and Warning Squadron, being known as Kamloops Air Station.

In September 1957, operations began at the unit's permanent home. The station was equipped with AN/FPS-3A, AN/FPS-20, AN/FPS-87A; AN/FPS-6B, and AN/FPS-507 radars.

As a GCI base, the 918th's role was to guide interceptor aircraft toward unidentified intruders picked up on the unit's radar scopes. These interceptors were based at the 25th Air Division, Larson Air Force Base in Washington.

In the early 1960s, the USAF relinquished control of the base to the Royal Canadian Air Force (RCAF). This was part of an arrangement with the United States that came as a result of the cancellation of the Avro Arrow. Canada would lease 66 F-101 Voodoo fighters and take over operation of 12 Pinetree radar bases.

Upon hand-over on 1 April 1962, the operating unit was inactivated and replaced by the RCAF No. 56 Aircraft Control & Warning Squadron and the base became RCAF Station Kamloops.  Radars at the station were also upgraded to the following:
 Search Radars: AN/FPS-3A, AN/FPS-20, AN/FPS-87A
 Height Radars: AN/CPS-6B, AN/FPS-507

Radar operations at 56 Squadron were automated on 1 May 1963 by the Semi Automatic Ground Environment (SAGE) system, and the station became a long-range radar site. It would no longer guide interceptors but only look for enemy aircraft, feeding data to the Spokane Air Defense Sector SAGE DC-15 Direction Center of the 25th NORAD Region.

As a result of the unification of the Canadian Forces in 1968, the new Canadian Forces organization absorbed the RCAF, RCN and the Canadian Army. 56 Radar Squadron, RCAF Station Kamloops, became simply Canadian Forces Station (CFS) Kamloops in 1967.

Beginning in 1983 the station began reporting to Canada West ROCC.  CFS Kamloops closed on 1 April 1988, the 64th anniversary of the Royal Canadian Air Force.

The Station briefly came back to life when the movie "Cadence", starring Charlie Sheen and Laurence Fishburne, was filmed at the site in 1990.

The site is now virtually abandoned, except for two areas now used by Telus, which has a communication installation.  The buildings stood until around 1997 but have since been removed. The city of Kamloops moved the last search antenna to be used at CFS Kamloops, an AN/FPS-20, to Riverside Park as a memorial to the former radar station.  The dedication plaque at the Riverside Park states ------

See also
 List of Royal Canadian Air Force stations
 List of USAF Aerospace Defense Command General Surveillance Radar Stations

References

 Cornett, Lloyd H. and Johnson, Mildred W., A Handbook of Aerospace Defense Organization  1946 - 1980,  Office of History, Aerospace Defense Center, Peterson AFB, CO (1980).
 Winkler, David F. & Webster, Julie L., Searching the Skies, The Legacy of the United States Cold War Defense Radar Program,  US Army Construction Engineering Research Laboratories, Champaign, IL (1997).
 Information for Kamloops AS, BC

Kamloops
Radar stations of the United States Air Force
Aerospace Defense Command military installations
Installations of the United States Air Force in Canada
1957 establishments in British Columbia
1988 disestablishments in British Columbia
Military installations established in 1957
Military installations closed in 1988